The 2019 Women's Asian Individual Squash Championships is the women's edition of the 2019 Asian Individual Squash Championships, which serves as the individual Asian championship for squash players. The event took place at National Squash Centre in Kuala Lumpur from 1 to 5 May 2019.

Seeds

  Annie Au (final)
  Joshna Chinappa (champions)
  Joey Chan (quarterfinals)
  Low Wee Wern (semifinals)
  Liu Tsz Ling (quarterfinals)
  Sivasangari Subramaniam (semifinals)
  Rachel Arnold (third round)
  Tong Tsz Wing (third round)

  Satomi Watanabe (quarterfinals)
  Sunayna Kuruvilla (third round)
  Jemyca Aribado (third round)
  Lai Wen Li (third round)
  Aifa Azman (third round)
  Tanvi Khanna (quarterfinals)
  Anatana Prasertratanakul (second round)
  Aparajitha Balamurukan (third round)

Draw and results

Finals

Top half

Section 1

Section 2

Bottom half

Section 3

Section 4

See also
2019 Men's Asian Individual Squash Championships
Asian Individual Squash Championships

References

2019 in squash
Squash in Asia
International sports competitions hosted by Malaysia
Squash tournaments in Malaysia
2019 in Malaysian women's sport
Asian Individual Squash Championships